Albulena Haxhiu (born 11 May 1987) is a Kosovo Albanian politician, who is a Member of Parliament for Vetëvendosje! in the Assembly of Kosovo.

Haxhiu studied law and finance at the University of Pristina. She is married and has three children. Haxhiu is the granddaughter of Kosovar political activist Ahmet Haxhiu.

References

External links
 

1987 births
Living people
21st-century women politicians
Female justice ministers
Government ministers of Kosovo
Justice ministers of Kosovo
Kosovo Albanians
Politicians from Pristina
Women government ministers of Kosovo
Vetëvendosje politicians